Mazuki Arai (born 28 November 1988) is a retired field hockey player from Japan.

Career

International hockey
Mazuki Arai made her debut for Japan in 2009, at the FIH Champions Challenge in Cape Town. The team won a bronze medal at the tournament, with Arai scoring twice. The following month she appeared at the Asia Cup in Bangkok.

In 2010, Arai won two medals with the national team. Her first was silver at the Asian Champions Trophy in Busan, followed by bronze at the Asian Games in Guangzhou. That year she also appeared at the FIH World Cup Qualifiers in Kazan, as well as the World Cup in Rosario.

Arai only made one appearance for the national team between 2011 and 2012 at the FIH Champions Trophy in Rosario.

2013 was Arai's most successful year with the national team, winning two gold medals. The first at the Asia Cup in Kuala Lumpur, and the second at the Asian Champions Trophy in Kakamigahara. 

Mazuki Arai retired from international hockey in 2014, following appearances at the 2014 FIH World Cup in The Hague and the 2014 Asian Games in Incheon.

In December 2019, Arai ended her career.

References

External links

1988 births
Living people
Japanese female field hockey players
Female field hockey forwards
Japanese sportswomen
Sportspeople from Osaka Prefecture
Asian Games medalists in field hockey
Asian Games bronze medalists for Japan
Medalists at the 2010 Asian Games
Field hockey players at the 2010 Asian Games
21st-century Japanese women